The Gem Theatre is a performing arts theater located in Detroit, Michigan. Built in 1927 in the Spanish Revival style, it houses a two level theater with traditional row and aisle seating along with stage-level seating at cabaret tables. The Gem Theatre was listed on the National Register of Historic Places in 1985. It shares a lobby with the cabaret-style Century Theatre, built in 1903.

History
In 1902, the  Twentieth Century Club, a group of cultural, socially prominent women, built a Mission-style building to house their club. The building, now the Century Theatre, is built of red brick trimmed with white sandstone. The first floor originally housed a dining room, while the second floor housed a 400-seat auditorium.

In 1928, the member of the Century club contracted George D. Mason to design a theater addition to the Century Club building. The resulting Spanish Revival-style building was leased to the Little Theatre chain, which showed foreign films, and the building was known as the Little Theatre.

In 1933, due to the Depression, the Twentieth Century Club disbanded. The Little Theatre, however, continued, suffering through several name changes, becoming The Rivoli in 1932, Drury Lane (and then the Europa in 1935, the Cinema in 1936, and the Vanguard Playhouse in 1960. The Vanguard offered live theater rather than movies.

The theater received its present name in 1967. The building was used as an adult movie house until it closed in 1978. Soon afterward, developer Charles Forbes purchased the combined Gem/Century building, and began a complete restoration of the Gem Theatre in 1990. The refurbished Gem opened in 1991.

Protected from demolition during urban renewal for Comerica Park, the newest home of the Detroit Tigers, the Gem Theatre and Century Theatre were moved five blocks on wheels to its new location at 333 Madison Street on 16 October 1997. At a distance of 563 meters (1,850 feet) it is the furthest known relocation of a sizable building.

References

Further reading

External links
 Gem Theatre

Culture of Detroit
Theatres in Detroit
Music venues in Michigan
Relocated buildings and structures in Michigan
Theatres on the National Register of Historic Places in Michigan
Event venues established in 1927
National Register of Historic Places in Detroit
1927 establishments in Michigan